La Historia is a DVD by A.B. Quintanilla y Los Kumbia Kings. It was released on October 21, 2003.

Track listing
 "Mi Gente"
 "Insomnio"
 "No Tengo Dinero"
 "La Cucaracha"
 "Desde Que No Estás Aquí"
 "U Don't Love Me"
 "Shhh!"
 "Boom Boom"
 "Se Fue Mi Amor"
 "Te Quiero a Ti"
 "Fuiste Mala"
 "Reggae Kumbia"
 "Azúcar"

References

2003 video albums
Kumbia Kings albums
A. B. Quintanilla albums
EMI Latin video albums
Music video compilation albums